Adam Kassen (born May 27, 1974) is an American independent film director, actor, writer and producer. He frequently collaborates with his brother Mark Kassen.

Career
In 2006, Kassen executive produced Bernard and Doris, which earned him an Emmy Award nomination for "Outstanding Made for Television Movie".

Adam made his directorial debut with brother, Mark Kassen, on the 2011 feature film Puncture, starring Chris Evans.  The Tribeca Film Festival selected the picture as one of its spotlight features in the 2011 program.

Filmography
Puncture (director)
Bernard and Doris (co-executive producer)
The Sasquatch Gang (co-producer)
The Good Student (co-producer)
Big Sur (2012) (co-producer)

References

External links
 

1974 births
Living people
Male actors from Syracuse, New York
English-language film directors
American film directors
American male screenwriters
Film producers from New York (state)
American male film actors
Writers from Syracuse, New York
Screenwriters from New York (state)